Maria Anna may refer to:

 Archduchess Maria Anna of Austria (1738–1789), the second but eldest surviving daughter of Maria Theresa, Queen of Hungary and Bohemia, and Francis I, Holy Roman Emperor.
 Maria Anna Adamberger (1752–1804), Viennese actress
 Maria Anna de Raschenau, eighteenth-century Viennese composer and nun
 Maria Anna Mozart, sister of Wolfgang Amadeus Mozart
 Maria Anna of Bavaria (1805–1877), Queen consort of Saxony
 Maria Anna of Neuburg (1667–1740), Queen consort of Spain
 Maria Anna of Portugal (1843–1884)
 Maria Anna of Savoy (1803–1884), daughter of Victor Emmanuel I of Sardinia and wife of Emperor Ferdinand I of Austria
 Maria Anna of Spain (1606–1646), aka Maria Anna of Austria, daughter of Philip III of Spain and wife of Ferdinand III, Holy Roman Emperor
 Maria Anna Sophia of Saxony (1728–1797)
 Maria Anna Thekla Mozart, cousin of Wolfgang Amadeus Mozart
 Maria Anna von Genzinger (1750–1793), Viennese amateur musician and friend of Joseph Haydn
 Maria-Anna Galitzine (born 1954), Catholic activist

See also
 Anna Maria (disambiguation)
 Maria Anna of Bavaria (disambiguation)
 Archduchess Maria Anna of Austria (disambiguation)
 Archduchess Maria of Austria (disambiguation)